Leonid Yosipovich Buryak (born 10 July 1953) is a Ukrainian football coach, and a former Olympic bronze-medal-winning player.

Career
Buryak was born in Odessa, in the Soviet Union.  He was a midfielder for the USSR national football team. He competed for the Soviet Union at the 1976 Summer Olympics, at which he won a bronze medal.

Buryak played for a number of teams in the Soviet Union, most notably for Dynamo Kyiv, of which he was also the sporting manager. As a player, he had a tremendous impact on his team, similar to what Pavel Nedvěd or Zinedine Zidane had on theirs. Buryak has coached the Ukraine national football team.

In 1979 Buryak played couple of games for Ukraine at the Spartakiad of the Peoples of the USSR.

Coach of Ukraine national team 
In 2002, Leonid Buryak was appointed coach of the Ukraine national team. Making this choice, the Football Federation set the target for the new coach to get into the final part of the 2002 European Championship. The preparation for the main matches began with the defeat of the Japanese team in the first match for Buryak-coach. 

As part of the qualifying tournament, the Ukrainian team managed to play with a score of 2-2 in Yerevan in the first match, then there was a significant victory over the Greek team. However, Buryak's team, which took the final third place in the qualifying round, failed to enter into the final part of the championship. Leonid Buryak left the national team.

Awards

Ballon d'Or
1975 – 23rd

Soviet Footballer of the Year
1981 – 3rd.

Grigory Fedotov Club
Scored 103 goals during their professional career.

Statistics for Dynamo

The statistics in USSR Cups and Europe is made under the scheme "autumn-spring" and enlisted in a year of start of tournaments

References

1953 births
Living people
Footballers from Odesa
Soviet footballers
Soviet expatriate footballers
Expatriate footballers in Finland
Ukrainian football managers
Ukrainian expatriate football managers
Expatriate football managers in Finland
Expatriate soccer managers in the United States
Expatriate football managers in Russia
FC Nyva Ternopil managers
FC Chornomorets Odesa managers
Evansville Purple Aces men's soccer coaches
Ukraine national football team managers
Soviet Union international footballers
Footballers at the 1976 Summer Olympics
Olympic footballers of the Soviet Union
Olympic bronze medalists for the Soviet Union
1982 FIFA World Cup players
Soviet Top League players
FC Chornomorets Odesa players
FC Dynamo Kyiv players
FC Torpedo Moscow players
FC Metalist Kharkiv players
FC Dynamo Kyiv managers
Ukrainian Premier League managers
Olympic medalists in football
FC Arsenal Tula managers
FC Oleksandriya managers
Medalists at the 1976 Summer Olympics
Association football midfielders
Recipients of the Order of Prince Yaroslav the Wise, 5th class
Recipients of the Order of Merit (Ukraine), 1st class
Recipients of the Order of Merit (Ukraine), 2nd class
Recipients of the Order of Merit (Ukraine), 3rd class